The Night Time Concert is the second part of Elton John's "Night and Day Concert".
It was released for home video on VHS and Laserdisc.

Track listing
 "Sorry Seems to Be the Hardest Word"
 Medley: "Blue Eyes/I Guess That's Why They Call It the Blues"
 "Kiss the Bride"
 "Too Low for Zero"
 "I'm Still Standing"
 "Your Song"
 "Saturday Night's Alright (For Fighting)"
 "Goodbye Yellow Brick Road"
 "Crocodile Rock"
 Medley: "Whole Lotta Shakin' Goin On/I Saw Her Standing There/Twist and Shout"

Elton John video albums
Elton John live albums
Live video albums
1984 live albums
1984 video albums